Lake Brownworth is a meltwater lake immediately west of Wright Lower Glacier at the east end of Wright Valley, Victoria Land. The lake was mapped by the United States Geological Survey (USGS) from surveys and air photos obtained in 1956–1960. It was named by the Advisory Committee on Antarctic Names for Frederick S. Brownworth Jr., a USGS topographic engineer who worked several seasons in Antarctica. In 1970–1971 he supervised aerial photography of the dry valleys of Victoria Land, including this lake.

References
 

Lakes of Victoria Land
McMurdo Dry Valleys